Davit Gvaramadze (born 8 November 1975 in Tbilisi) is a retired Georgian footballer.

Career
Gvaramadze started his career at Dinamo Tbilisi. During spells at Torpedo Kutaisi, he competed with former international footballer Irakli Zoidze. Later he re-joined Zoidze in Dinamo Tbilisi.

International career
Gvaramadze made his debut on 8 February 1998, a friendly match. He became a regular during UEFA Euro 2000 qualifying, played 6 matches. He also played 6 matches in 2002 FIFA World Cup qualification (UEFA). In October 2002, he was withdrew from Georgia squad due to family reason, Since that match, he lost the regular place to Giorgi Lomaia. He played his farewell games in 2004 Cyprus Tournament.

References

External links

Footballers from Georgia (country)
Expatriate footballers from Georgia (country)
Georgia (country) international footballers
FC Dinamo Tbilisi players
Skonto FC players
FC Torpedo Kutaisi players
PFC Krylia Sovetov Samara players
Russian Premier League players
Expatriate footballers in Latvia
Expatriate footballers in Russia
Association football goalkeepers
Footballers from Tbilisi
1975 births
Living people
Expatriate sportspeople from Georgia (country) in Latvia
FC Dinamo Batumi players
Expatriate sportspeople from Georgia (country) in Russia
Erovnuli Liga players